Ziroatkhon Mahmudovna Hoshimova, also shortened to Ziroat Mirziyoyeva, is the First Lady of Uzbekistan.

Biography
She was born in the city of Kokand in the Ferghana valley on 4 December 1957. Her father Mahmudjon Hoshimov was a wealthy official in the Fergana Valley, heading the Supply Department of the Central Asian Railway in Kokand. She studied at the Tashkent Institute of Irrigation and Melioration where she met her first husband. According to some sources, the Ziroathon family opposed her marriage. She has a qualification of an engineer-economist.

First Lady 

She is married to Shavkat Mirziyoyev, the current president of Uzbekistan and the former Prime Minister of Uzbekistan. During the Karimov era, while her husband was prime minister, she was not shown on state television and avoided public appearances. When her husband became president she accompanied him on several foreign trips abroad including trips to Kyrgyzstan, China, South Korea, the United States and Turkey.

Public work 
She is the chairman of the board of trustees of the Zamin International Public Foundation. In an online speech on behalf of the foundation, she declared that having a disability "is no longer a medical issue, but a human rights issue".

References

First Ladies of Uzbekistan
Living people
People from Kokand
Shavkat Mirziyoev
1957 births